Jorge Garciarce Dávila (born 29 December 2004), also known as George Garciarce, is a Mexican racing driver. He currently competes in the U.S. F2000 National Championship with DEForce Racing in 2023. He is the 2022 Gran Turismo Mexico champion. Garciarce previously competed in the Italian Formula 4 Championship with Jenzer Motorsport in 2021.

Racing record

Career summary 

† As Garciarce was a guest driver, he was ineligible for points.

* Season still in progress.

Complete Italian F4 Championship results 
(key) (Races in bold indicate pole position) (Races in italics indicate fastest lap)

American open-wheel racing results

U.S. F2000 National Championship 
(key) (Races in bold indicate pole position) (Races in italics indicate fastest lap) (Races with * indicate most race laps led)

* Season still in progress.

References 

2004 births
Living people
Mexican racing drivers
ADAC Formula 4 drivers
U.S. F2000 National Championship drivers

Italian F4 Championship drivers
Spanish F4 Championship drivers
Jenzer Motorsport drivers
NACAM F4 Championship drivers